Euthalia lubentina, the gaudy baron, is a species of nymphalid butterfly found in South, Cambodia, and Southeast Asia. It was first described by Pieter Cramer in 1777.

Description
Male. Upperside dark greenish brown. Forewing: a bar across middle and a bar beyond the apex of the cell crimson bordered with black: a slightly oblique transverse discal series of small white spots from costa to interspace 1, followed by a preapical curved row of four similar spots and a transverse subterminal series of elongate black spots forming an obscure band. Hindwing: a crescent-shaped black loop near apex of the cell area; a curved postdiscal series of four or five crimson spots outwardly bordered with black, the subcostal spot the largest, followed by a subterminal series of velvety-black subquadrate spots, the anterior three and the tornal spot outwardly crimson. Underside dark purplish brown suffused slightly with ochraceous, the markings as on the upperside but larger and more clearly defined, and in addition: forewing: two small black spots at base; basal half of costal margin crimson; hindwing: four crimson spots bordered with black at base; costal and dorsal margins crimson; another spot in the postdiscal series; the velvety-black spotting of the upperside more or less obsolete. Antennae dark brown, club beneath crimson; head, thorax and abdomen dark greenish brown; beneath, the palpi and the forelegs crimson, the rest pale brown.

Female. Similar, paler. Upperside forewing: the transverse crimson bands in cell obscure with a broad black-bordered white band interposed, the discal series of white spots very large, very irregular in shape. Hindwing: the ground colour suffused with greenish blue on terminal posterior half of wing; markings similar to those of the male. Underside brown, the tornal half of the hindwing bluish green. Forewing: the markings as on the upperside with the addition of two small black spots at base and an obscure broad terminal pale band. Hindwing with four black-bordered transverse crimson spots at base in addition to the markings as on the upperside. Antennae, head, thorax and abdomen as in the male, but paler; the palpi beneath with a stripe of pink, the forelegs whitish.

Distribution
On continental India southward from Bombay.

Life history

Egg
Its egg is reddish brown.

Larva
Armed with ten pairs of long, horizontally projected, very delicately branched spines. Colour grass green with a dorsal row of large purplish-brown angulated spots each with or without a small pure white diamond spot in its middle, these dorsal spots placed on the anterior half of the 4th, 6th, 7th, 9th, 10th, 11th and 12th segments; the lateral spines green tipped with purple brown.

Pupa
Green, but with two lateral brown marks, each with a dirty-white centre and two brown points equally with whitish centres between these and the terminating projection.

Gallery

References

L
Butterflies of Asia
Butterflies of Indochina
Butterflies of Sri Lanka
Insects of Bangladesh
Insects of Myanmar
Butterflies described in 1777
Taxa named by Pieter Cramer